The 1897 Washington Agricultural football team was an American football team that represented Washington Agricultural College during the 1897 college football season. The team competed as an independent under head coach Robert Gailey and compiled a record of 2–0.

Schedule

References

Washington Agricultural
Washington State Cougars football seasons
College football undefeated seasons
Washington Agricultural football